The women's 200 metre backstroke event at the 2000 Summer Olympics took place on 21–22 September at the Sydney International Aquatic Centre in Sydney, Australia.

Diana Mocanu emerged as a newcomer on the international swimming, after effortlessly winning her second gold at these Games. She maintained a lead from start to finish, and posted a new Romanian record of 2:08.16, the third-fastest of all time, making her the fourth swimmer in Olympic history to strike a backstroke double, since Ulrike Richter did so in 1976, Rica Reinisch in 1980, and Krisztina Egerszegi, the three-time champion in the event, in 1992. France's world champion Roxana Maracineanu, born with Romanian heritage, seized off an early lead on the first length, but fell short only for the silver in 2:10.25. Japan's Miki Nakao powered home with the bronze in 2:11.05 to hold off her fast-pacing teammate Tomoko Hagiwara (2:11.21) by 16-hundredths of a second.

U.S. swimmer Amanda Adkins improved a lifetime best of 2:12.35 to move herself up from seventh to fifth spot on the final half, finishing ahead of Spain's Nina Zhivanevskaya (2:12.75), the bronze medalist in the 100 m backstroke five days earlier, by four-tenths of a second (0.40). Meanwhile, Germany's Antje Buschschulte (2:13.31) and Canada's Kelly Stefanyshyn (2:14.57) rounded out the finale.

Records
Prior to this competition, the existing world and Olympic records were as follows.

Results

Heats

Semifinals

Semifinal 1

Semifinal 2

Final

References

External links
Official Olympic Report

B
2000 in women's swimming
Women's events at the 2000 Summer Olympics